
Year 801 (DCCCI) was a common year starting on Friday (link will display the full calendar) of the Julian calendar.

Events 
 By place 

 Europe 
 Emperor Charlemagne formally cedes Nordalbian territory (modern-day Schleswig-Holstein) to the pagan Obotrites (allies of the Carolingian Empire).
 April 3 – King Louis the Pious, son of Charlemagne, captures Barcelona after a siege of several months. Bera is appointed first count of Barcelona.

 Britain 
 King Eardwulf of Northumbria leads an army into Mercia against his rival, Coenwulf, in order to flush out other claimants to the Northumbrian throne.
 A synod appears to have been held at Chelsea, as an extant charter (Sawyer 158) records a confirmation of a land grant by Coenwulf, the king of Mercia that was part of the council's proceedings.

 By topic 

 Religion 
 Rabanus Maurus, Frankish Benedictine monk, takes his vows in the monastery of Fulda and receives ordination as a deacon.

Births 
 September 8 – Ansgar, Frankish monk and archbishop (d. 865)
 June 17 – Drogo of Metz, illegitimate son of Charlemagne
 Al-Kindi, Muslim philosopher and polymath (approximate date)
 Waldrada of Worms, Frankish Duchess, married to Conrad II
 Wang Chengyuan, general of the Tang Dynasty (d. 834)

Deaths 
Heathoberht, Bishop of London
 Rabia Basri, Muslim Sufi mystic and saint (b. 717)

References

Sources